The 1893 Gonzaga Blue and White football team was an American football team that represented Gonzaga University during the 1893 college football season. In their second season they played one game, a 16–0 win over Spokane High School. They were under second year head coach Henry Luhn.

Schedule

References

Gonzaga
Gonzaga Bulldogs football seasons
College football undefeated seasons
Gonzaga Blue and White football